Woodvale Historic District is a national historic district located at Broad Top Township, Bedford County; Wells Township, Fulton County; and Wood Township, Huntingdon County, Pennsylvania.  The district includes 79 contributing buildings, 1 contributing site, and 2 contributing structures in the coal mining community of Woodvale. The buildings date between about 1890 and 1942, and include industrial buildings, institutional buildings, and vernacular worker's housing. They were built by the Rockhill Iron and Coal Company. Non-residential buildings include the Methodist Church (1911), St. Michael's Greek Orthodox Church (1930s), a social hall, a mule barn, power house, railroad machine shop (1918), and post office (1919).

It was added to the National Register of Historic Places in 1992.

References

Historic districts on the National Register of Historic Places in Pennsylvania
Historic districts in Bedford County, Pennsylvania
Buildings and structures in Fulton County, Pennsylvania
Historic districts in Huntingdon County, Pennsylvania
National Register of Historic Places in Huntingdon County, Pennsylvania
National Register of Historic Places in Bedford County, Pennsylvania
National Register of Historic Places in Fulton County, Pennsylvania